Hatch is a surname, and may refer to:

 Annia Hatch (born 1978), Cuban-American gymnast, who competed at the 2004 Olympics
 Ashley Hatch (born 1995), American soccer player
 A. Gould Hatch (1896–1970), New York politician
 Beatrice Hatch, muse of Lewis Carroll
 Carl Hatch (1889–1963), U.S. Senator from New Mexico
 Sir David Hatch (1939–2007), BBC Radio executive
 Edward Hatch (1832–1889), American general and Indian fighter
 Edwin Hatch (1835–1889), English theologian
 Eric S. Hatch (1901–1973), American novelist
 Ethel Hatch (1869-1975), daughter of Edwin Hatch
 Evelyn Hatch (1871 – 1951), daughter of Edwin Hatch
 George Hatch, mayor of Cincinnati from 1861 to 1863
 George C. Hatch (1919–2009), American businessman, cable TV pioneer
 Harry C. Hatch (1884–1946), industrialist from Prince Edward County, Ontario
 Hector Hatch (born 1936), Fijian sportsman, politician and civil servant
 Henry John Hatch (1818–1895), English clergyman sent to Newgate for indecent assault but subsequently pardoned
 Herschel H. Hatch (1837–1920), U.S. Representative from Michigan
 Ike Hatch (1892–1961), American musician and club owner in Britain
 Israel T. Hatch (1808–1875), U.S. Representative from New York
 Jack Hatch (born 1950), Iowa State Senator
 Jethro A. Hatch (1832–1912), U.S. Representative from Indiana
 John Porter Hatch, (1822–1901), American soldier
 Mary R. P. Hatch (1848-1935), American writer
 Melville Hatch (1898–1988), American entomologist who specialized in the study of beetles
 Mike Hatch (born 1948), attorney general of Minnesota
 Orrin Hatch (1934–2022), U.S. Senator from Utah
 Ozias M. Hatch (1814-1893), Illinois Secretary of State
 Richard Hatch (disambiguation), several people
 Sidney Hatch (1883–1966), an American athlete who competed for the United States in the 1904 Summer Olympics
Stephani Hatch, American sociologist and psychiatric epidemiologist
 Thom Hatch, American author
 Thomas Hatch, American baseball player
 Thomas V. Hatch, Utah politician
 Tony Hatch (born 1939), English composer, songwriter, pianist, music arranger and producer
 Wilbur Hatch (1902–1969), an American music composer
 William Hatch (disambiguation), several people